A total solar eclipse occurred at the Moon's ascending node on April 8, 2005. A solar eclipse occurs when the Moon passes between Earth and the Sun, thereby totally or partly obscuring the image of the Sun for a viewer on Earth. A total solar eclipse occurs when the Moon's apparent diameter is larger than the Sun's, blocking all direct sunlight, turning day into darkness. Totality occurs in a narrow path across Earth's surface, with the partial solar eclipse visible over a surrounding region thousands of kilometres wide.
This eclipse is a hybrid event, a narrow total eclipse, and beginning and ending as an annular eclipse.

It was visible within a narrow corridor in the Pacific Ocean. The path of the eclipse started south of New Zealand and crossed the Pacific Ocean in a diagonal path and ended in the extreme northwestern part of South America. The total solar eclipse was not visible on any land, while the annular solar eclipse was visible in the southern tip of Puntarenas Province of Costa Rica, Panama, Colombia and Venezuela.

Images
Animated path

Gallery

Related eclipses

Eclipse season 

This is the first eclipse this season.

Second eclipse this season: 24 April 2005 Penumbral Lunar Eclipse

Eclipses of 2005
 A hybrid solar eclipse on April 8.
 A penumbral lunar eclipse on April 24.
 An annular solar eclipse on October 3.
 A partial lunar eclipse on October 17.

Tzolkinex 
 Preceded: Solar eclipse of February 26, 1998

 Followed: Solar eclipse of May 20, 2012

Half-Saros 
 Preceded: Lunar eclipse of April 4, 1996

 Followed: Lunar eclipse of April 15, 2014

Tritos 
 Preceded: Solar eclipse of May 10, 1994

 Followed: Solar eclipse of March 9, 2016

Solar Saros 129 
 Preceded: Solar eclipse of March 29, 1987

 Followed: Solar eclipse of April 20, 2023

Inex 
 Preceded: Solar eclipse of April 29, 1976

 Followed: Solar eclipse of March 20, 2034

Solar eclipses 2004–2007

Saros 129

Metonic series

Notes

References
Hybrid Solar Eclipse of 2005 April 08 (NASA.gov)

 Google Map

Photos:
Prof. Druckmüller's eclipse photography site. South Pacific (MV Discovery)
Prof. Druckmüller's eclipse photography site. Pacific (MV Galapagos Legend)
Spaceweather.com eclipse gallery
Clouds, Plane, Sun, Eclipse, North Carolina, USA APOD 4/11/2005
Hybrid Solar Eclipse, combined photo of totality 2,200 kilometers west of the Galapagos and annularity at Penonome Airfield APOD 5/6/2005
A Rare Hybrid Solar Eclipse, APOD 11/3/2013

2005 04 08
2005 04 08
2005 in science
April 2005 events
2005 in Costa Rica
2005 in Panama
2005 in Colombia
2005 in Venezuela